Eucalyptus brevipes, commonly known as the Mukinbudin mallee, is a mallee that is endemic to Western Australia. It has coarse, fibrous to flaky back on the trunk and larger branches, smooth grey to pinkish bark above. The adult leaves are linear to narrow lance-shaped, the flower buds are arranged in groups of seven, the flowers are white and the fruit is cylindrical or barrel-shaped.

Description
The glossiness of the leaves increases as the plant matures. Flowering occurs from July to September and the flowers are white or creamy white. Eucalyptus brevipes is similar to E. gracilis but can be distinguished by its erect leaves.

Taxonomy and naming
Eucalyptus brevipes was first formally described in 1986 by Ian Brooker and the description was published in the journal Nuytsia from a specimen he collected near Cunderin Hill, between Mukinbudin and Bonnie Rock. The specific epithet (brevipes) is from the Latin words brevis meaning “short” and pes meaning "foot", referring to the pedicels.

Distribution and habitat
Mukinbudin mallee is found among granite outcrops in the Wheatbelt region of Western Australia between Mukinbudin and Nungarin where it grows on sandy-loamy soils. It is often found in open low scrub country along with Eucalyptus loxophleba, Eucalyptus kochii, and Acacia acuminata.

There are 14 known populations of this species that are known ten of which occur on unallocated crown land. The main threats to the species are fire, road works, and firebreak maintenance. It is thought to be able to resprout from a lignotuber following a fire.

Conservation
Eucalyptus brevipes is classified as "endangered by the Australian Government Environment Protection and Biodiversity Conservation Act 1999 and as "Threatened Flora (Declared Rare Flora — Extant)" by the Department of Environment and Conservation (Western Australia). The main threats to the species are fire, road works and firebreak maintenance.

See also

List of Eucalyptus species

References

brevipes
Endemic flora of Western Australia
Trees of Australia
Endangered flora of Australia
Myrtales of Australia
Eucalypts of Western Australia
Plants described in 1986
Taxa named by Ian Brooker